Bayramca Tunnel, is a highway tunnel constructed in Ordu Province, northern Turkey.

Bayramca Tunnel is part of the Samsun-Ordu Highway   within the Black Sea Coastal Highway, of which construction was carried out by the Turkish S.T.Y. Construction Company. The -long twin-tube tunnel carrying two lanes of traffic in each direction. The Yunus Emre Tunnel follows the Bayramca Tunnel in direction Samsun.

The tunnel was opened to traffic on 21 December 2013 by Turkish Prime Minister Recep Tayyip Erdoğan.

References

External links
 Map of road tunnels in Turkey at General Directorate of Highways (Turkey) (KGM)

Road tunnels in Turkey
Transport in Ordu Province
Tunnels completed in 2013